William Allan (26 August 1870 – 1948) was a Scottish footballer who played as a goalkeeper in the English Football League for Sheffield Wednesday. He was the Owls regular goalkeeper for their first three seasons in the league, but lost his place to Jimmy Massey and took no part in the winning run to the 1895–96 FA Cup, having already departed at the start of 1896.

References

Scottish footballers
1870 births
1948 deaths
Date of death missing
Footballers from Angus, Scotland
People from Montrose, Angus
Victoria United F.C. players
Orion F.C. players
Montrose F.C. players
Millwall F.C. players
Sheffield Wednesday F.C. players
English Football League players
Association football goalkeepers